Salon is a constituency of the Uttar Pradesh Legislative Assembly covering the city of Salon in the Rae Bareli district of Uttar Pradesh, India.

Salon is one of five assembly constituencies in the Amethi Lok Sabha constituency. Since 2008, this assembly constituency is numbered 181 amongst 403 constituencies.

Election results

2022

2017
Bharatiya Janta Party candidate Dal Bahadur won in 2017 Uttar Pradesh Legislative Elections defeating Indian National Congress candidate Suresh Choudhary by a margin of 16,055 votes.

References

External links
 

Assembly constituencies of Uttar Pradesh
Raebareli district